Penaeus monodon, commonly known as the giant tiger prawn, Asian tiger shrimp, black tiger shrimp, and other names, is a marine crustacean that is widely reared for food.

Taxonomy
Penaeus monodon was first described by Johan Christian Fabricius in 1798. That name was overlooked for a long time, until 1949 when Lipke Holthuis clarified to which species it referred. Holthuis also showed that P. monodon had to be the type species of the genus Penaeus.

Description
The carapace and abdomen are transversely banded with alternative red and white. The antennae are grayish brown. Brown pereiopods and pleopods are present with fringing setae in red.

Distribution
Its natural distribution is the Indo-Pacific, ranging from the eastern coast of Africa and the Arabian Peninsula, as far as Southeast Asia, the Pacific Ocean, and northern Australia.

It is an invasive species in the northern waters of the Gulf of Mexico and the Atlantic Ocean off the Southern U.S.

Invasive species 
The first occurrence of P. monodon in the U.S. was in November 1988. Close to 300 shrimp were captured off the Southeastern shore after an accidental release from an aquaculture facility. This species can now be caught in waters from Texas to North Carolina. Although P. monodon has been an invasive species for many years, it has yet to grow large established populations. Escapes in other parts of the world, though, have led to established P. monodon populations, such as off West Africa, Brazil, and the Caribbean.

Habitat 
P. monodon is suited to inhabit a multitude of environments. They mainly occur in Southeastern Asia, but are widely found. Juveniles of P. monodon are generally found in sandy estuaries and mangroves, and upon adulthood, they move to deeper waters (0- 110 meters) and live on muddy or rocky bottoms. The P. monodon has shown to be nocturnal in the wild, burrowing into substrate during the day, and coming out at night to feed. P. monodon typically feed on detritus, polychaete worms, mollusks, and small crustaceans. They feed on algae, as well. Due to their nutrient-rich diet, these shrimp are unable to consume phytoplankton because of their feeding appendages, but they are able to consume senescent phytoplankton. They also commence mating at night, and can produce around 800,000 eggs.

Aquaculture
P. monodon is the second-most widely cultured prawn species in the world, after only whiteleg shrimp, Litopenaeus vannamei. In 2009, 770,000 tonnes were produced, with a total value of US$3,650,000,000. P. monodon makes up nearly 50% of cultured shrimp alone.

The prawn is popular to culture because of its tolerance to salinity and very quick growth rate. However, they are very vulnerable to fungal, viral, and bacterial infections. Diseases such as white spot disease and yellowhead disease have led to a great economic impact in shrimp industries around the globe. They can receive transmitted diseases from other crustaceans such as the Australian red claw crayfish (Cherax quadricarinatus), which is susceptible to yellowhead disease and has shown to transmit it to P. monodon in Thailand.

Since black tiger shrimp are susceptible to many diseases, this engenders economic constraints towards the black tiger shrimp food industry in Australia, which is farm-raised. To confront such challenges, attempts have been made to selectively breed specific pathogen-resistant lines of black tiger shrimp.

P. monodon has been farmed throughout the world, including areas such as West Africa, Hawaii, Tahiti, and England. For optimal growth, P. monodon is raised in waters between 28 and 33°C. Characteristically for the Penaeus genus, P. monodon has a natural ability to survive and grow in a wide range of salinity, though its optimal salinity is around 15-25 ppt. While in a farm setting, the shrimp are typically fed a compound diet, which is produced in dried pellets. By mixing the diet to have compound feeds and fresh feed, P. monodon was shown to have better reproductive performance.

Sustainable consumption 
In 2010, Greenpeace added P. monodon to its seafood red list – "a list of fish that are commonly sold in supermarkets around the world, and which have a very high risk of being sourced from unsustainable fisheries". The reasons given by Greenpeace were "destruction of vast areas of mangroves in several countries, overfishing of juvenile shrimp from the wild to supply farms, and significant human-rights abuses".

Basic research

In an effort to understand whether DNA repair processes can protect crustaceans against infection, basic research was conducted to elucidate the repair mechanisms used by P. monodon.  Repair of DNA double-strand breaks was found to be predominantly carried out by accurate homologous recombinational repair.  Another, less accurate process, microhomology-mediated end joining, is also used to repair such breaks.

See also

Macrobrachium rosenbergii, the giant freshwater prawn

References

Penaeidae
Edible crustaceans
Commercial crustaceans
Crustaceans described in 1798
Taxa named by Johan Christian Fabricius